The 1948 New York Yankees season was their third in the All-America Football Conference. The team failed to improve on their previous output of 11-2-1, winning only six games. For the first time in three seasons, and the only time in franchise history, they did not qualify for the playoffs.

The team's statistical leaders included Spec Sanders with 918 passing yards, 759 rushing yards, and 58 points scored, and Bruce Alford with 578 receiving yards and 42 points scored.

Season schedule

Division standings

References

New York Yankees (AAFC) seasons
New York Yankees
New York Yankees AAFC
1940s in the Bronx